Odigbo is a Local Government Area in Ondo State, Nigeria. Its headquarters are in the town of Ore.

The current census as of 2020 is over 600,000 as Ore Town continue to attract new inhabitants from every part of the country. The people of Odigbo local government are from the Yoruba lineage. These people include The Odigbos, and the Araromi Obus who largely observe similar customs and  uphold the same traditional as other Yorubas. The people of odigbo local government speak a local dialect close to the ondos. These people cover the towns and the villages of Ore town, Agbabu, Lafe, Modebiayo, Isheba, Oke-Oluwa, Ayetedo, Ago Alaye, Ajebamidele, Ajebambo, Kajola, Aiyesan, Oniparaga, Imorun, Laleipa, Okefara, Ayetoro, Sidigi, Oke-Ojakoparun, Lokuta, Araromi oil palm estate, Basola, Agirifon, Adewinle, Aiyetimbo, Koseru, Omowole, Onipetesi, Mile 49, Labon, Akinseye, Temidire, Sokoto, Bolorunduro, Fesojoye, Oduduwa village, Ajibodu. The odigbo local government people share boundary with the Ondos in the north, the Ikales in the east, the Ijebus of Ogun State in the south and Osun State in the west.

It is also noteworthy that several villages in Odigbo local government are inhabited by non-indigenes like people from Oyo and Osun States as well as the Ikale people of Irele and Okitipupa local government areas of Ondo state. The biggest town of Odigbo local Government is Ore Town, this town is the major town separating the southwest from the Southeast. The Local Government Office is situated in Ore... People from every part of the country lives in Ore Town because it's a commercial Town...

The postal code of the area is 350.

History
Odigbo local government has two major kingdoms; Odigbo kingdom and  Araromi-Obu kingdom. The paramount ruler of Odigbo kingdom is HRM the Orunja of Odigbo while the paramount ruler of Araromi-Obu kingdom is the HRM, the Ajobu of Araromi-Obu. The Major towns in Odigbo local government are Araromi-Obu, Odigbo, Ajue, Ore, etc. Many parts of Odigbo local government are inhabited by non-indigenes like people from Oyo  and Osun States and some parts are occupied by the Ikale people of Okitipupa and Irele local government areas of Ondo State. Odigbo is the owner of the bitumen, stated in ondo state.

References

Local Government Areas in Ondo State